Rubén Garabaya (born 15 September 1978) is a Spanish former handball player.

He participated at the 2008 Summer Olympics in Beijing as a member of the Spain men's national handball team. The team won a bronze medal, defeating Croatia.

References
 The Official Website of the Beijing 2008 Olympic Games

1978 births
Living people
People from Avilés
Spanish male handball players
Liga ASOBAL players
FC Barcelona Handbol players
CB Ademar León players
BM Valladolid players
Handball players at the 2008 Summer Olympics
Olympic handball players of Spain
Olympic bronze medalists for Spain
Olympic medalists in handball
Medalists at the 2008 Summer Olympics
Mediterranean Games gold medalists for Spain
Competitors at the 2005 Mediterranean Games
Mediterranean Games medalists in handball
Sportspeople from Asturias